Uğurköy (Georgian: აკრია  Akria) is a village in the Borçka District, Artvin Province, Turkey. Its population is 234 (2021).

References

Villages in Borçka District